Severny is a rural locality (a settlement) in Svetloyarsky District, Volgograd Oblast, Russia. The population was 264 as of 2010. There are 10 streets.

References 

Rural localities in Svetloyarsky District